In the mathematical fields of Lie theory and algebraic topology, the notion of Cartan pair is a technical condition on the relationship between a reductive Lie algebra  and a subalgebra  reductive in . 

A reductive pair  is said to be Cartan if the relative Lie algebra cohomology 
 
is isomorphic to the tensor product of the characteristic subalgebra 
 
, the Samelson subspace, are those primitive elements in the kernel of the composition , 
 is the transgression, 
and the map  of symmetric algebras is induced by the restriction map of dual vector spaces .

On the level of Lie groups, if G is a compact, connected Lie group and K a closed connected subgroup, there are natural fiber bundles
,
where 

is the homotopy quotient, here homotopy equivalent to the regular quotient, and
.

References

Cohomology theories
Homological algebra
Lie algebras